Gilbert Henry Blanco (born December 15, 1945) is an American former Major League Baseball pitcher. Blanco was signed by the New York Yankees in 1964. In 28 Major League games, nine as a starting pitcher, had a career record of 3–5, an ERA of 4.45, with 35 strikeouts and 48 bases on balls in 58⅔ innings pitched.

External links

1945 births
Living people
Baseball players from Arizona
American expatriate baseball players in Canada
Major League Baseball pitchers
New York Yankees players
Kansas City Athletics players
Oklahoma City 89ers players
Mobile A's players
Birmingham A's players
Winnipeg Whips players
Buffalo Bisons (minor league) players
Columbus Confederate Yankees players
Iowa Oaks players
Fort Lauderdale Yankees players
Vancouver Mounties players